Intergalactic was a British science fiction television series created by Julie Gearey. The series follows a crew of fierce female convicts who break free and go on the run. On  it was announced that series was cancelled by Sky.

Premise
In 2143, climate change has wrought the planet and the world’s cities, now mostly under new structures, are controlled by a pseudodemocratic government called the "Commonworld". Sky cop Harper (Savannah Steyn) is framed for a crime and placed onboard prisoner transport ship the Hemlock bound for an off-planet prison. She is thrown into a mutiny stirred up by a band of hardened female criminals who threaten to kill her if she doesn’t fly them to safety.

Cast

Main

 Savannah Steyn as Ash Harper, a police officer with the Commonworld Police, framed for the theft of aurum, the critically dwindling energy source for Commonworld
 Eleanor Tomlinson as Candy Skov-King, an inmate on board the prison transport ship Grand Commonworld Carrier (GCC) Hemlock, an alien from the Aurean galaxy in debt to Tula
 Natasha O'Keeffe as Emma Grieves, an inmate on Hemlock, former lead scientist of Commonworld, founding member of the ARC, a resistance movement against Commonworld's environmental damage to other planets
 Sharon Duncan-Brewster as Tula Quik, an inmate on Hemlock, planner of the prison break
 Thomas Turgoose as Drew Bunchanon, a guard on Hemlock
 Imogen Daines as Verona Flores, a cyber-hacker inmate on Hemlock
 Diany Samba-Bandza as Genevieve Quik, a cyber-enhanced fighter inmate on Hemlock, Tula's daughter
 Craig Parkinson as Dr. Benedict Lee, Leader of the Commonworld government
 Parminder Nagra as Arch-Marshall Rebecca Harper, Head of Galactic Security for the Commonworld and Ash’s mother

 Oliver Coopersmith as Echo Nantu-Rose, a space pirate who joins the group on Hemlock
 Hakeem Kae-Kazim as Yann Harper, a war hero, an ARC leader and Ash's father
 Phyllis Logan as Phoebe Skov-King, Candy's mother

Supporting
 Neil Maskell as Sergeant Wendell, Ash’s supervising officer, a member of the ARC resistance who frames Ash for a major theft, serving Yann Harper’s plan to reunite with his daughter
 Samantha Schnitzler as Captain Alessia Harris, a member of Arch-Marshall Harper's Galactic Security
 Emily Bruni as the voice of the Hemlock
 Lisa Palfrey as Zeeda, a ruthless crime lord

Episodes

Production
Iona Vrolyk serves as series executive producer. The first five episodes of the eight episode series were directed by Kieron Hawke, the following three by China Moo-Young.

International release
In Australia, the series was released on 1 May 2021 on Stan. In United States, the series was released on 13 May 2021 on Peacock, and was later broadcast on Syfy debuting on 10 November 2021. In New Zealand, the series was released on 18 May 2021 on Sky's Sky Go and Neon streaming service.

Reception
Empire Ian Freer awarded the series' two out of five stars. He complimented Intergalactic diverse female cast and ambitious story but criticised what he regarded as the "up on-the-nose writing, blunt performances and an overwhelming sense of déjà vu." He also described the series as derivative of older franchises including Star Wars, Firefly, Blake's 7, and Alien.

NME Australia's Ralph Jones awarded Intergalactic two out of five stars, opining that the series' visuals and expensive computer generated imagery were offset by its poor dialogue and story.

The Independent Sean O'Grady gave Intergalactic three out of five stars. While commending the series' straight-forward plot, he criticised its lack of "human emotions and motivations."

Stuff's James Croot gave Intergalactic a mixed review, describing the space drama as a female–led, futuristic version Con Air. While criticising the series' lack of novelty and what he regarded as its insufficient action scenes and special effects, Croot commended the series' makeup, costumes, and production design. He also praised the performance of cast members Savannah Steyn, Parminder Nagra, Eleanor Tomlinson, and Natasha O'Keeffe.

Liam Maguren of the NZ entertainment news website Flicks gave Intergalactic a favourable review, praising its female ensemble cast for defying the film industry's stereotype of "strong female women" being heroic and faultless characters by featuring strong female characters with flaws.

References

External links
 
 

2021 British television series debuts
2021 British television series endings
2020s British drama television series
2020s British science fiction television series
2020s British television miniseries
Bisexuality-related television series
English-language television shows
Female bisexuality in fiction
Lesbian-related television shows
LGBT speculative fiction television series
Sky UK original programming
Television series by Tiger Aspect Productions
Television series by Endemol
Television shows set in Manchester
Television shows set in Spain
Television series set in the 22nd century